

See also 
 Lists of fossiliferous stratigraphic units in Europe

References 
 

 Serbia
Geology of Serbia
Fossiliferous stratigraphic units